Kim Jung-hyun (born June 28, 1976) is a South Korean actor. He starred in TV series such as Gwanggaeto, The Great Conqueror (2011), Dangerous Women (2011), My Lover, Madame Butterfly (2012), Empress Ki (2013), My Mother is a Daughter-in-law (2015) and Vagabond (2019). He also starred in Dogme 95-produced film Interview (2000).

Awards and nominations

References

External links
 
 

1976 births
Living people
South Korean male television actors
South Korean male film actors
20th-century South Korean male actors
21st-century South Korean male actors
Seoul Institute of the Arts alumni